Phyllonorycter kisoensis is a moth of the family Gracillariidae. It is known from the main island of Honshū in Japan and from the Russian Far East.

The wingspan is 6.2–8 mm.

The larvae feed on Alnus hirsuta. They mine the leaves of their host plant. The mine has the form of a tentiform blotch-mine on the underside of the leaf, usually situated on the space between the lateral veins or rarely along the leaf-margin. It is very large, and elliptical in outline. The lower epidermis of the mining part is constricted, with five to eight longitudinal wrinkles.

References

kisoensis
Moths of Asia
Moths described in 1978